Barman Thar (IPA: /bɔɾmɔn thaɾ/), where “thar” means language, is a highly endangered language. It is a Tibeto-Burman language that belongs to the Boro–Garo sub-group. The population of the Barman Kachari community is 24,237, according to a 2017 census. However, only a small part of this population speaks the language.

History 

The Barman Kacharis are an indigenous Assamese community of Northeast India and are a subsection of the Dimasa people. They are mainly found in the districts of Lower Assam and in Barak Valley like Hailakandi and Karimganj and some parts of Arunachal Pradesh. Barman Kachari is one of the ancient ethnic groups of North-East India. Since the 2002 Amendment act, many Barman Kacharis in Assam are referred to as 'Barman'. They are mainly found in the districts of Udalguri, Baksa, Chirang, Kokrajhar, Darrang, Kamrup, Goalpara, Nagaon, Lakhimpur, Dhemaji, Cachar and Barpeta. Barmans are called Kacharis because of their Kachari origin. They are spread diffusely, in Assam and in places such as Meghalaya, Tripura and Nagaland.

Barman Kachari villages are scattered over the state of Meghalaya, like the Garo Hills and Khasi Hills, and also in Tripura. Prior to Indian independence, several Barman Kachari settlements existed in the Mymensingh and Sylhet districts of present-day Bangladesh. Partition of the country had resulted in the migration of these people to then undivided Assam.

In 1708, during the reign of Tamradhaj, Kachari people adopted Hindu customs. By 1825, in the days of Govinda Chandra, the Kachari king, along with some noble families, had to flee Khaspur, migrating to Mymensingh and Sylhet. This was due to the attack of the Ahoms and Manipuri armies as well as frequent attacks by Burma. In 1826, the Kachari king returned to his homeland after signing the Treaty of Yandaboo with the British, though the treaty stipulated that Assam be placed under British rule. The Kachari King Govinda Chandra died in 1830.

Demographics 
The Barman Kacharis of Assam are classified as a Scheduled Tribe (Plains) in the valley of Barak (however, the Barman Kacharis of Brahmaputra Valley remain unscheduled till date). The Barman Kacharis number some 24,237 persons, according to a 2017 census. Out of this number, 12,555 are males and 11,503 are females. Their literacy rate is estimated at 4 percent. The level of literacy of males and females is 2.5% and 1.5%, respectively.

Documentation 

The language of the Barman Kacharis had never been documented until 2019 when M.A. students in Linguistics and Language Technology (Batch 2018-2020) of Tezpur University carried out field work for the first time on this language.

Phonology 
The Barman Thar phonemic inventory consists of eight vowels, nine diphthongs, and twenty consonants (including two semivowels).

Consonants

In Barman Thar, there are twenty consonants.

It is to be noted that pʰ and z have idiolectal variations. They are, by some people, sometimes pronounced as ɸ and d͡z respectively. For example, the word pʰa (meaning “father”) is sometimes pronounced as ɸa and nɐmza (meaning “bad”) is sometimes pronounced as nɐmd͡za.

Gemination 
Gemination, which is the twinning of two consonants, is also found in  the Barman language.

Consonant Clusters 
In the study of Barman Thar, carried out by the students of Tezpur University, they found only one word, i.e. bɾui, with a consonant cluster. It is a cluster of two consonants, b and ɾ. And they found no final cluster in any word.

Vowels

In Barman Thar, there are eight vowels and nine diphthongs.

Monophthongs

Diphthongs

Morphology and Grammar 
Case:

Tense and Aspect

Three  of the tenses are morphologically marked in Barman Thar.

In Barman Thar, the present tense is marked with the suffix “-a”, the past tense, with “-ja” and the future tense, with “-ɡɐn”. And the following are the four aspects:

Pronouns

Negation

In Barman Thar, verbs are negated by suffixing “-za” and “-zia” for present and past tense respectively.

For example, the root word for the verb “eat” in Barman Thar is “ca”. The negative form of the word in the present tense is caza (ca+za), meaning “do/does not eat” and that in the past tense is cazia (ca+zia), meaning “did not eat”.

Again, in case of imperative sentences, the suffix -nɔŋ is use.

For example, mei canɔŋ means “Don't eat rice.” [mei means “rice”, and canɔŋ is bi-morphemic, formed by the root word for “eat”, i.e. ca, and the imperative negative marker -nɔŋ.]

Classifiers

In Barman Thar, there is one classifier, i.e. -ja.

doisaja sijai hiŋaja

doisa-ja            sija-i                 hiŋ-(a)ja

boy-CL             die-PFV            go-PST

“The boy died.”

Allomorphs

Another feature of this language that needs to be mentioned is the presence of allomorphs.

Allomorphs of the past tense marker:

-ja is the past tense marker. But when this morpheme is suffixed to a verb ending in [m], it becomes -maja. For example, cum + -ja = cummaja. When it is suffixed to a verb ending in [n], it becomes -naja as in dɛn + -ja = dɛnnaja. When it is affixed to a verb ending in [ŋ], it becomes -aja, as in hiŋaja (hiŋ + -ja).

Therefore, it can be said that -maja, -naja and -aja are allomorphs of the morpheme -ja.

Allomorphs of the ergative case marker:

-a is the ergative case marker in Barman Thar. However, when it is affixed to a noun ending in a vowel, it becomes -ja. For example, sita + -ja = sitaja.

So, -ja is an allomorph of the ergative case marker -a.

References

Bibliography 

Joseph, U.V., and Burling, Robbins. 2006. Comparative phonology of the Boro Garo languages. Mysore: Central Institute of Indian Languages Publication.
 
 
 

Sal languages
Languages of Assam